Soborom is a group of hot springs with accompanying fumaroles and mud volcanoes in the Tibesti Mountains of Chad. Three dispersed groups of vents are active there, some of which are used as spas by the local population.

Name and use 

The name "" means "boiling water" in Tedaga; it refers to the hottest spring and has been applied to the entire field.  means "dog fighting a mouflon". The springs are sometimes named "Yerike", and other times "Soborom" is translated as "healing waters". Reportedly the local people use the springs as a spa, but the political situation makes access to the area difficult.

Geography and springs 

Soborom lies in the Tibesti Mountains of the Sahara. The Soborom depression and a similar structure at Souradom farther south are both volcano-tectonic domes which now form depressions; geothermal processes are only known from Soborom however.

There, between  elevation lie clusters of exhalations, fumaroles, hot springs, mud volcanoes, solfataras and reportedly a geyser as well. In some places the ground is hot enough that standing there is uncomfortable.

The springs produce small quantities of water—averaged over the entire field only a few litres per minute—that is quite muddy due to the high content of particles.

The central and southern areas are located on dry valleys. Within the depression, various drainages converge into the southwestward flowing Enneri Soborom-Souradom, which has incised the hot spring deposits and is itself the site of the western area. A waterfall lies in the area, and there are two noticeable river terraces as well which feature thermal activity.

The activity has eroded the country rocks and left deposits, including sulfur and geyserites, sulfates and chlorides, which are generated by the deposition of the gases and chemical reactions between the gases and the air. The sulfur often forms flower-like structures at the gas vents. The exhalations are extremely corrosive, consuming tinplate within a few weeks and turning the rock into a porridge-like substance.

Individual vents 

The individual areas feature the following structures:
Sometimes very intense exhalations are found dispersed over this area and in a gully.
 The central area features seven bubbling hot springs as well as mud volcanoes and fumarolic exhalations. It contains the hottest spring, "Soborom". "Dead" mud volcanoes can also be found here.
 The western area lies on the terraces of a dry valley and within the dry valley itself and is the least active. It features two hot springs and some fumaroles with little activity, plus remnants of a mud volcano. The Toubou people use the western area's "Toubou-bath" as a bath.

The inactive area is bordered by dry valleys on the north and the south, while the central and southern active areas are located directly north and west, respectively.

Geology 

The Tibesti Mountains formed through an interplay of tectonic phenomena and volcanism, with the central high sector of the mountains formed by Cenozoic volcanism, while the lower parts were formed during Precambrian to Cenozoic age. At Soborom, these volcanics crop out in various series known as the "Middle Dark Series", "Middle Bright Series" and "Upper Dark Series".

References

Sources 

 
 

Hot springs
Geography of Chad